In enzymology, a 2-coumarate reductase  or melilotate dehydrogenase is an enzyme that catalyzes the chemical reaction

3-(2-hydroxyphenyl)propanoate + NAD+  2-coumarate + NADH + H+

Thus, the two substrates of this enzyme are 3-(2-hydroxyphenyl)propanoate and NAD+, whereas its 3 products are 2-coumarate, NADH, and H+.

This enzyme belongs to the family of oxidoreductases, specifically those acting on the CH-CH group of donor with NAD+ or NADP+ as acceptor.  The systematic name of this enzyme class is 3-(2-hydroxyphenyl)propanoate:NAD+ oxidoreductase.  This enzyme participates in phenylalanine metabolism.

References 

 

EC 1.3.1
NADH-dependent enzymes
Enzymes of unknown structure
Hydroxycinnamic acids metabolism